Plain Talk was an American monthly anticommunist magazine that lasted for 44 months (1946–1950). Its editor-in-chief was Isaac Don Levine.

Description
Plain Talk featured articles by many conservative writers of the time, including John Chamberlain, Suzanne La Follette, Eugene Lyons, George S. Schuyler, and Ralph de Toledano. The magazine was published on a monthly basis.

History
In the 1970s, Levine wrote that in July 1946, Benjamin Mandel (a "guide to the mission" of the magazine), accompanied by Father John F. Cronin and Alfred Kohlberg, approached Levine at home in Norwalk, Connecticut. Kohlberg funded $25,000 for it, a free office, and funding for five staffers.

The magazine was established in 1946, and the first issue appeared in October 1946. Its low circulation and readership levels made the magazine cease publication in May 1950. Former US President Herbert Hoover had provided some "half-hearted" funding, but it did not succeed in shoring up the magazine.

Connected to the magazine was the name Theodore Cooper Kirkpatrick, who, with fellow ex-FBI agent Kenneth M. Bierly, was implicated in "pirating" of security informants for Plain Talk magazine and soon for Counterattack newsletter. Kirkpatrick and Bierly also used FBI information to capitalize upon their association. Kirkpatrick and Bierly joined with a third ex-FBI agent, John G. Keenan, to form "John Quincy Adams Associates" in Washington, DC, and then "American Business Consultants, Inc.," in New York City, the publisher of Counterattack newsletter.

In 1950, several writers and editors from Plain Talk stated to work for The Freeman, which was founded later that year and acquired the Plain Talk subscription list.

Personnel
 Isaac Don Levine, editor
 John Chamberlain
 Suzanne La Follette
 Eugene Lyons
 Guenther Reinhardt
 George S. Schuyler
 Ralph de Toledano

Works
An anthology of articles from the magazine was published in 1976.

 Plain Talk magazine (October 1946–May 1950)
 Plain Talk: An Anthology from the Leading Anti-Communist Magazine of the 40s (1976)

See also
 Red Channels

References

Further reading

 

Conservative magazines published in the United States
Anti-communist organizations in the United States
Defunct political magazines published in the United States
Magazines established in 1946
Magazines disestablished in 1950